Gavin Higgins (born in 1983) is a British composer who resides in London.

Early life and education 
Higgins was born in Gloucestershire and grew up in the Forest Of Dean. There, he started his education in music, due to his family's membership of a local brass band. His first instrument was the cornet, which he started learning during infancy. He also played the tenor horn.

At 16, Higgins went to Chetam's School of Music in Manchester on a scholarship. He then studied French horn and composition at the Royal Northern College of Music.

Higgins has a history of coal miners and brass band musicians in his family, the fact of which was inspiration for his ballet, Dark Arteries, for brass band and dance ensemble, based on the Miners Strike of 1984-85.

Career 
After moving to London, Higgins became the inaugural Music Fellow for Rambert Dance Company in 2010.

He also wrote music for What Wild Ecstasy, and Dark Arteries, both ballets created in collaboration with then Rambert Artistic Director, Mark Baldwin. What Wild Escstasy was commissioned as part of PRS for Music Foundation's 'New Music 20x12 scheme', in association with the 2012 Olympics. Dark Arteries was commissioned to commemorate the 30 year anniversary of the 1984-85 UK miners' strike and was inspired by the events of the strike and as well as Higgins' mining-linked heritage.

Higgins has written three pieces for the BBC Proms, Der Aufstand (2012), Velocity (which opened the Last night of the Proms 2014) and most recently Rough Voices (2020). He has also composed a trombone concerto, The Book of Miracles for the BBC Symphony Orchestra, premiered in early 2019.

The Royal Opera House commissioned Higgins and author Francesca Simon to write an Opera based on Simon's book, The Monstrous Child, about the teenage Norse god of the dead, Hel. Higgins wrote the music for the opera, while Simon wrote the libretto. The opera premiered in 2019 in the Linbury theatre at the Royal Opera House.

In 2020 Gavin was appointed the Composer in Association for the BBC National Orchestra of Wales.

Selected works

Solo 
 Three Broken Love Songs (2006) - for clarinet and piano 
 Urban Fairy Tales (2009) - solo piano
 Kathedrale (2013) - solo accordion 
 A Quiet Grief (2020) - solo horn

Chamber 
 Atomic Cafe (2012)  - for ensemble.
 The Ruins of Detroit (2013) - piano trio
 Gursky Landscapes (2018)  - string quintet
 Ekstasis (2019) - string sextet

Orchestral 
 Der Aufstand (2012) 
 Velocity (2014)
 The Book of Miracles: Trombone Concerto (2019)
 While Time Quietly Kills Them – revised (2020)
 Rough Voices (2020)
 Concerto Grosso for Brass Band and Orchestra (2022)

Ballet and opera 
 What Wild Ecstasy (2012) - Ballet
 Dark Arteries (2016) - Ballet with brass band
 The Monstrous Child (2019) - Opera

Brass and wind 
 Freaks (2007)
 Fanfares and Love Songs (2009) 
 Destroy, Trample, As Swiftly As She (2011)
 Prophecies (2017) 
 A Dark Arteries Suite (2017)
 So Spoke Albion (2022)

Awards 
In 2019 Higgins won an Ivor Novello Composer Award in the orchestral category for his trombone concerto, Book of Miracles. His Concerto Grosso for Brass Band and Orchestra was recognized with a Royal Philharmonic Society Award in 2023 for best large-scale composition.

References

External links
 Official Website

1983 births
Living people
British classical composers
21st-century British composers
Alumni of the Royal Northern College of Music
21st-century classical composers
English male classical composers
English opera composers
Musicians from London
People educated at Chetham's School of Music
21st-century British male musicians